Mathar Kula Manikkam is a 1956 Indian Tamil-language drama film directed by T. Prakash Rao. The film stars Gemini Ganesan, Akkineni Nageswara Rao, Anjali Devi and Savitri, with music composed by S. Rajeswara Rao. It is based on Rabindranath Tagore's 1906 novel Noukadubi. The screenplay and dialogue were written by Vempati Sadasivabrahmam and C. V. Sridhar, respectively. The film was simultaneously made in Telugu under the title Charana Daasi, both versions were critical and commercial successes.

Plot 
The film is based on two couples – where the first couple Dr. Chandra Shekar and Parvathi and the second couple is Ravi and Lakshmi. Ravi and Lakshmi are happy lovers. Ravi is summoned and asked to marry another girl forcibly. Since his father's life and honor are at stake, Ravi agrees to the marriage. Simultaneously, another marriage takes place in the same village; Dr. Chandra Shekar visits his best friend's sister marriage, but the marriage cancels in the last moment due to dowry problems. To keep up his friend's prestige, Shekar marries his sister,  Parvathi. Due to the sudden marriage, the couple hasn't seen each other. Thereby because marriage is happening without his wish, Ravi has also not seen the bride's face. Both the bridal parties are traveling on the same train, which meets with a disastrous accident. In the accident, Ravi's parents and wife are killed. Parvathi was lying unconscious in bridal dress and Ravi mistakes her as his wife and takes her to home. Shekar thinks that both his friend & wife are dead.

Before it is too late, Ravi realizes his terrible mistake. He keeps it secret from Parvathi and engaged himself in the relentless task of finding Parvathi's husband and restoring them. Before he could succeed, there arise clashes between him and Lakshmi because she mistakes Parvathi as Ravi's wife. Parvathi also discovers the truth and fled from Ravi's house with shame and agony, She fells into a river and fate again intervened to be saved by her own mother-in-law and lands in her husband Shekar's house. Living in her in-law's she is not able to reveal her identity because of a hesitation that Shekar may doubt her virginity. Meanwhile, fate again struck; Lakshmi gets mentally sick because of the cheating done by Ravi and she is admitted in Shekar's hospital; only during the time of treatment Lakshmi, Shekar, and their families come closer. Their parents want to make the marriage. Parvathi also happily agrees to make remarriage to her husband. During the time of the engagement, Ravi arrives and reveals the entire truth. Shekar also accepts Parvathi wholeheartedly and both of them thank Ravi. Lakshmi also says sorry to him. Finally, the movie ends on a happy note with the marriage of Ravi & Lakshmi.

Cast 
Cast according to the opening credit of the film

Male cast
 Gemini Ganesan as Chandrasekar
 A. Nageswara Rao as Ravi
 S. V. Ranga Rao
 K. A. Thangavelu
 D. Balasubramaniam
 K. Sarangapani
 Kaka Radhakrishnan
 Friend Ramasami
 Balaji
 C. V. V. Panthulu
 M. A. Ganapathi Bhat
 M. S. Natarajan
 K. M. S. Mani

Female cast
 Anjali Devi as Parvathi
 Savithri as Lakshmi
 P. Kannamba
 M. N. Rajam
 K. R. Chellam
 S. D. Subbulakshmi
Dance
 Kamala Lakshmanan
 Ragini
 Rita

Production 
The film is based on Rabindranath Tagore's novel, The Wreck. The director T. Prakash Rao chose to replace the boat crash sequence in the novel with a train accident in the film, inspired by a real event that took place near Ariyalur. C. V. Sridhar, then an up-and-coming writer, was recruited as the dialogue writer. The film was shot simultaneously in Tamil and Telugu languages, with the Telugu version titled Charana Daasi. Mathar Kula Manikkam was the only Tamil film in which Anjali Devi and Savitri co-starred.

Soundtrack 
The soundtrack was composed by S. Rajeswara Rao and lyrics were written by Udumalai Narayana Kavi, Thanjai N. Ramaiah Dass and A. Maruthakasi.

Release 
Mathar Kula Manikkam and Charanadasi, the Tamil and Telugu versions respectively, were released the same year and were box-office successes. The former helped Gemini Ganesan and Anjali Devi establish a career in Tamil cinema.

References

External links 
 

1950s Tamil-language films
1956 films
1956 romantic drama films
Films based on Indian novels
Films based on works by Rabindranath Tagore
Films directed by T. Prakash Rao
Films scored by S. Rajeswara Rao
Indian black-and-white films
Indian romantic drama films